A buck is a cocktail that is made with ginger ale or ginger beer, citrus juice, and any of a number of base liquors. Buck cocktails are sometimes called "mules" due to the popularity of a vodka buck that is known as a Moscow Mule.

History
The buck is believed to have gotten its name when someone added a shot of whiskey to the previously nonalcoholic Horse's Neck, which consisted of ginger ale with lemon juice. The added alcohol gave the horse a "kick" – hence, a bucking horse.

Variations
Variations include:
Bourbon, rye, or whiskey buck.
Kentucky Buck, containing bourbon and strawberry.
Gin buck, containing gin. Sometimes known as British Buck or London Buck.
Gin Gin Mule, containing gin and mint. Also known as a Ginger Rogers (after the actress of the same name.)
Irish buck, containing Irish whiskey
Mamie Taylor, containing scotch whisky.
Rum buck, also called a Barbados buck or Jamaican buck to indicate the origin of the rum.  Adding lime to a Dark 'n' Stormy creates a rum buck.
Shanghai buck, made with light rum, and served at the Shanghai Club in the 1930s.
Vodka buck, also known as a Moscow mule, invented in Los Angeles, California, US, and largely responsible for the popularity of vodka in the United States from the 1940s through 1960s.
Chilcano, made with Pisco.
Variations using brandy and other liquors
Addition of syrups, different types of juice, fresh ginger, mint, and various garnishes

See also
 
 List of cocktails

References

Cocktails
Spicy cocktails
Sweet cocktails
Cocktails with Scotch whisky